Fernando Damata Pimentel (born 31 March 1951) is a Brazilian politician and economist. He is a member of the Workers' Party (PT). He was the Mayor of Belo Horizonte from 2001 to 2009, the Minister of Development, Industry and Foreign Trade in the Cabinet of former Brazilian president Dilma Rousseff from 2011 to 2014 and the Governor of Minas Gerais from 2015 to 2019.

Life

Fernando Pimentel studied Economy at the Federal University of Minas Gerais. He is a member of the PT, a party he helped to create.

He has been married twice and has two adopted children.

Academic career
He has held a teaching position and engaged in scholarly activity as coordinator of the Extension Center of the Faculty of Economic Sciences, UFMG. Since August 1978, he has been an assistant professor in their Department of Economics.
He is also an active member of the professional categories of entities, has held the vice-presidency of the Association of University Teachers of Belo Horizonte (1985–1987) and he was president of the Regional Economy of Minas Gerais (1991–1992), having been reelected twice; Furthermore, he was a counselor of the same for an overlapping time, between 1990–1992. He was also director of the Union of Economists of Minas Gerais (1986–1992).

See also
 List of Mayors of Belo Horizonte, Brazil

External links
Nominated for World Mayor 2005

|-

|-

Living people
Pontifical Catholic University of Minas Gerais alumni
Brazilian economists
Workers' Party (Brazil) politicians
Mayors of Belo Horizonte
1951 births
Governors of Minas Gerais